UEFA Euro 2020 was an international football tournament that took place in June and July 2021 involving 24 men's national teams from nations affiliated to the Union of European Football Associations (UEFA). The tournament was broadcast via television and radio all over the world.

Television

UEFA

Rest of world

Radio

UEFA

Rest of world

References

Broadcasting Rights
2020